Malkoff is a surname. Notable people with the surname include:

Amy Malkoff, American singer-songwriter, musician, and producer
Dave Malkoff (born 1976), American television journalist
Mark Malkoff (born 1977), American comedian
Sol Malkoff (1918–2001), American calligrapher